Lakeview Place is a  park in Seattle, Washington. According to the city parks department as of 2013, it was the smallest park in Seattle.

See also
Mill Ends Park, the world's smallest park, in Portland, Oregon

References

External links
Lakeview Place at Seattle Parks and Recreation

Parks in Seattle